The Volvo P3 platform/Ford EUCD platform (for "European Class D") is Ford's global midsize car automobile platform launched in 2006. 

EUCD was chosen by Ford's European operations instead of the Ford CD3 platform due to the large number of components shared with the smaller C1. Another factor was reportedly the inability of the CD3 to accept Volvo's straight-5 engines.

The first EUCD cars were introduced at the 2006 Geneva Motor Show: Volvo's S80 (Volvo P3 platform) and Ford's S-MAX and Galaxy share about half of their total parts; for example, the steering columns on the Galaxy, S-Max and S80 share 80 percent of their parts.

The Jaguar Land Rover D8 platform is a heavily modified derivative of the EUCD.

Vehicles

After separation from Ford, Jaguar Land Rover (JLR) continued to develop the EUCD platform; deriving the heavily modified LR-MS/JLR D8 platforms from it. Variations of the D8 are used for the 2011 Range Rover Evoque, the 2015 Land Rover Discovery Sport and the 2017 Jaguar E-Pace.

Ford's new global CD-segment platform
For the 2013MY, the Fusion mid-size (C/D) car migrated to the Ford CD4 platform, a new common global platform. Its European counterpart, the Mondeo, made the transition to CD4 when the fifth generation hit the market for the 2015MY.

References

Notes

2006 introductions
EUCD
EUCD